Peltasta pseudozonula is a moth of the family Gelechiidae. It was described by Vladimir Ivanovitsch Kuznetsov in 1960. It is found in Turkmenistan (western Kopet-Dagh) and northern Iran.

Adults are known from the western Kopet Dag, where it occurs in desert habitats at elevations between 400 and 500 meters from mid-April to mid-May.

References

Moths described in 1960
Gelechiini